Gustavo Roberto Chena (born 16 August 1982) is an Argentine former football player.

References

External links
 Gustavo Chena at BDFA.com.ar 
 Gustavo Chena at PlayerHistory.com

1982 births
Living people
Argentine footballers
Argentine expatriate footballers
Boca Juniors footballers
Argentine expatriate sportspeople in Malaysia
Expatriate footballers in Malaysia
Perlis FA players
Argentine expatriate sportspeople in Indonesia
Expatriate footballers in Indonesia
Indonesian Premier Division players
Persija Jakarta players
Persebaya Surabaya players
PSMS Medan players
PSIS Semarang players
Liga 1 (Indonesia) players
Deltras F.C. players
Gresik United players
Association football midfielders
Footballers from Santa Fe, Argentina